Charles Immanuel Forsyth Major (15 August 1843, Glasgow – 25 March 1923, Munich) was a Scottish-born, Swiss physician, zoologist and vertebrate palaeontologist.

Major was born in Glasgow and studied at Basel and Zurich Universities in Switzerland and later Göttingen in Germany. He graduated in medicine at Basel in 1868 and became a physician in Florence, Italy.

Like many early naturalists he spent his free time studying fossil mammals. His first publication was on fossil primates in 1872. The Italian government supported him in 1877 and he collected fossils from Calabria, Corsica, Sardinia, and Sicily. In 1886, he stopped practising as a physician and began to study fossils in the Greek Archipelago with his collections going to the College Galliard at Lausanne and to the British Museum (Natural History). In the British Museum collections he took a keen interest in material from Madagascar. He studied the lemur fauna, both extant and extinct, discovered the new family Megaladapidae (Major 1893), genus and species of the extinct giant lemur Megaladapis madagascariensis (Major 1893), and five new species in the genera Lepilemur and Cheirogaleus. This led to a keen interest in Madagascar and initiated an expedition to it. His field trip was funded by The Royal Society along with funds from Lionel Walter Rothschild, F. DuCane Godman, Sir Henry Peek and himself. The expedition started from Britain on 15 July 1894 and returned on 30 August 1896. In the two years they amassed large collections which arrived in 73 crates.

References

19th-century Swiss zoologists
Major
1843 births
1923 deaths
British emigrants to Switzerland
Scientists from Basel-Stadt